Topsail is a defunct provincial electoral district for the House of Assembly of Newfoundland and Labrador, Canada. In 2011, there are 11,080 eligible voters living in the district. The district was abolished in 2015 and was mostly replaced by Topsail-Paradise. Parts of the riding were also redistributed into Mount Scio, Mount Pearl North and Conception Bay South.

Topsail was located on the eastern shore of Conception Bay and included parts of the city of Mount Pearl and the towns of Conception Bay South and Paradise. The residential mix was suburban and sometimes rural, although many residents had commutes to St. John's.

Topsail was created in a 1995 redistribution, incorporating much of Conception Bay South and a small part of Mount Scio-Bell Island.

The 2007 redistribution changed the district significantly. Fifty-four per cent of it was retained, 32 per cent moved to Conception Bay South, 10 per cent moved to Mount Pearl North and four per cent shifted to Conception Bay East-Bell Island. The district also gained 16 per cent of both Waterford Valley and Conception Bay East-Bell Island. (CBC Electoral District Profile)

The district was represented by Liberal Ralph Wiseman, from 1996 until 2003. Wiseman was defeated by Progressive Conservative candidate Elizabeth Marshall in the 2003 general election, Marshall was re-elected in 2007 garnering 83% of the vote. In January 2010 Prime Minister Stephen Harper appointed Marshall to the Senate of Canada.

In the by-election held on March 16, 2010 Progressive Conservative candidate Paul Davis held on to the seat for the governing Tories, winning over 81% of the vote.

Members of the House of Assembly
The district has elected the following Members of the House of Assembly:

Election results

|-

|-
 
|NDP
|Brian Nolan
|align="right"|1,507
|align="right"|26.69
|align="right"|+18.44
|-

|}

^ Change is from 2007

}

 
|NDP
|Brian Nolan
|align="right"|374
|align="right"|11.17
|align="right"|+2.92

|}

|-

|-

|-
 
|NDP
|Kyle Rees
|align="right"|486
|align="right"|8.25
|align="right"|+2.48

|}

|-

|-

|-
 
|NDP
|Mike Kehoe 
|align="right"|472
|align="right"|5.77
|align="right"|-2.99

|}

|-

|-

|-
 
|NDP
|Mary Snow
|align="right"|568
|align="right"|8.76
|align="right"|

|}

|-

|-

|}

References

External links 
Website of the Newfoundland and Labrador House of Assembly

Newfoundland and Labrador provincial electoral districts
Conception Bay South
Mount Pearl
1995 establishments in Newfoundland and Labrador
2015 disestablishments in Newfoundland and Labrador